The Waihemo / Shag River is located in Otago in the South Island of New Zealand. The Dunback Branch railway that operated from the 1880s to 1989 largely followed the route of the river from its junction with the Main South Line near Shag Point township to its terminus in Dunback.

The small- to medium-sized river has been adversely affected over the past decades by farming practices in the area. Much of its length is overgrown with willows, and during the summer its flow can become significantly reduced.

In 1985, the name of the river was gazetted as Shag River (Waihemo). In August 2021, the name was officially amended to Waihemo / Shag River.

Waihemo means a ‘river that has gone away’ or ‘dwindled’. Early whalers named the river after the common seabird.

References

Rivers of Otago
Rivers of New Zealand